Luther Martin Henson (born March 25, 1959) is a former American football player who played defensive lineman for three seasons with the New England Patriots in the National Football League (NFL).

College career 
Henson graduated from Sandusky High School 1977 and went on to play defensive tackle for the Ohio State Buckeyes under coaches Woody Hayes and Earle Bruce.  Luther was selected as All Big 10 at the defensive tackle position for the years 1979 and 1980.

NFL career 
In 1982 Henson was signed as a free agent by New England Patriots under coach Ron Meyers. Henson played between 1982 and 1984.

References 

1959 births
Living people
New England Patriots players
Ohio State Buckeyes football players
Sportspeople from Sandusky, Ohio